Alex Forsyth or Alexander Forsyth may refer to:

 Alex Forsyth (ice hockey) (born 1955), Canadian ice hockey player
 Alex Forsyth (footballer, born 1952) (born 1952), Scottish footballer
 Alexander John Forsyth (1769–1843), Scottish minister who first successfully used chemicals to prime gunpowder in fire-arms
 Alex Forsyth (footballer, born 1928) (1928–2020), Scottish footballer